Oenomaus lea is a species of butterfly of the family Lycaenidae. It occurs in wet lowland forest up to 1,200 meters elevation in eastern Ecuador and eastern Peru.

The length of the forewings is 18.2 mm for males.

Etymology
The species is named for Léa Faynel, daughter of Christophe Faynel.

References

Insects described in 2012
Eumaeini
Lycaenidae of South America